Prosperidad, officially the Municipality of Prosperidad, is a 1st class municipality and capital of the province of Agusan del Sur, Philippines. According to the 2020 census, it has a population of 88,321 people.

Prosperidad was created on June 18, 1960, through Republic Act No. 2650.

Prosperidad is the venue of the Naliyagan Festival, an annual event celebrated by the entire province of Agusan del Sur. It also hosts its own festival called the Angot Festival celebrated every 28 September in honor of St. Michael the Archangel.

History

Prior to the Spanish Colonial Period, a Manobo settlement thrived at the junction of the Sianib and Gibong River. This settlement was known to the natives as Culilay.

During the Spanish Colonial Period, the missionaries discovered the settlement and soon began the Christianization of the Manobos. The natives were given Christian names and the settlement was renamed from Culilay to Las Navas", as the site was full of bancas, being the means of transportation at the time.

At the start of the American Period, Las Navas was bustling with local trades, but is experiencing constant flooding thus a new community,a business center cops up on a nearby site and was named 'Prosperidad' derived from the word Prospero or "progressive" as the place experienced growth and prosperity during the time of American Governor Zapanta.

Geography
According to the Philippine Statistics Authority, the municipality has a land area of  constituting  of the  total area of Agusan del Sur.

Climate

Barangays

Prosperidad is politically subdivided into 32 barangays.

Demographics

In the 2020 census, Prosperidad had a population of 88,321.

 Economy 

Infrastructure

Sports and recreation
The Patin-ay Sports Complex (Officially known as Democrito O. Plaza Sports Complex) has been constructed starting in the late 2018 and ends in year 2021. It has an artificial turf and rubberized track oval, the covered court has been upgraded, and the swimming pool will be upgraded into Olympic-size swimming pool. The main stadium capacity of the complex was 10,000 according to former Governor Adolph Edward Plaza in his address. Once its finished, they will become the host for the future sporting events such as Palarong Pambansa.

Education
A satellite campus of the Philippine Normal University is located in Poblacion (popularly known as Bahbah'') which was established in 1968.

References

External links

 [ Philippine Standard Geographic Code]

Municipalities of Agusan del Sur
Provincial capitals of the Philippines